The following is a list of football stadiums. They are ordered by their seating capacity, that is the maximum number of spectators that the stadium can accommodate in seated areas. All stadiums that are the home of a club or national team with a capacity of 40,000 or more are included. That is the minimum capacity required for a stadium to host FIFA World Cup finals matches.

 List of European stadiums by capacity
 List of Asian stadiums by capacity
 List of African stadiums by capacity
 List of South American stadiums by capacity
 List of American football stadiums by capacity

The list contains both stadiums used solely for football, and those used for other sports as well as football. Some stadiums are only used by a team for certain high attendance matches, like local derbies or cup games.

References

External links 
 Atlas of Worldwide Football (Soccer) Stadiums for GoogleEarth ***NEW***
 The 10 Biggest Football (or Soccer) Stadiums in the World listed by TheOffside.com
 The 10 Largest Football Stadiums in the World listed by SoccerLens.com
 The Top 10 Biggest Stadiums in the World listed by TopTensBest.com 
 Top 10 World's Largest Sports Stadiums listed by TheWondrous.com 
 Top Ten Biggest Sports Stadiums in the World listed by Top10Land.com
 10 oldest active football stadiums in the world listed by Sportskeeda.com
 Estadio at Real Madrid

 
Lists of sports venues with capacity